Zhao Dong (born July 1970) is a Chinese executive and politician of Manchu, currently serving as general manager of the China Petrochemical Corporation.

He is an alternate member of the 20th Central Committee of the Chinese Communist Party.

Biography 
Zhao was born in July 1970. 

He was deputy chief accountant of CNPC International (Nile) Co., Ltd. in May 1998 and subsequently chief accountant in July 2002. In January 2005, he became deputy chief accountant of China Petroleum Exploration and Development Company, rising to chief accountant in June 2008. He served as deputy general manager of the PetroChina Nile Company in September 2012, and eleven months later promoted to the general managerposition. After a year as CFO of the PetroChina Co Ltd., he became chief accountant of the China Petrochemical Corporation in November 2016. He rose to become general manager in June 2022, succeeding .

References 

1970 births
Living people
Manchu people
China University of Petroleum alumni
Alternate members of the 20th Central Committee of the Chinese Communist Party